John Roselius (August 19, 1944 - October 29, 2018) was an American film and television actor.  He appeared in numerous films, guest starred on many TV shows, and was the principal actor in over 200 television commercials.

He starred in the famed This Is Your Brain on Drugs public service announcement in the 1980s. In 2016, despite this previous credit, he came out in support of legalizing marijuana.

Filmography

References

External links

1944 births
American male film actors
American male television actors
2018 deaths